is a fault in Aichi Prefecture of Japan, which was responsible for the 1945 Mikawa earthquake.  It extends some 28 km (10 km under the sea) to Nishio City.  It flows into the Yokosuka fault which extends another 20 km.

External links
 Fukozu Fault pic

References

Seismic faults of Japan
Geography of Aichi Prefecture
Natural monuments of Aichi prefecture